Pterostylis concava, commonly known as the pouched greenhood or cupped banded greenhood, is a plant in the orchid family Orchidaceae and is endemic to the south-west of Western Australia. The plants either have a rosette of leaves in the years when not flowering or stem leaves on a flowering spike. When flowering, it has up to ten or more flowers which are dark reddish-brown, sometimes green and white with deeply cupped lateral sepals. It is an uncommon orchid, mostly found between Bindoon and Mount Barker.

Description
Pterostylis concava, is a terrestrial,  perennial, deciduous, herb with an underground tuber. The dorsal sepal and petals form a hood called the "galea" over the column. Flowering occurs from June to early September.

Taxonomy and naming
Pterostylis concava was first formally described in 1989 by David Jones and Mark Clements and the description was published in Australian Orchid Research from a specimen collected between Boyup Brook and Cranbrook. The specific epithet (concava) is a Latin word meaning "hollowed" or "arched inward" referring to the dished lateral sepals.

Distribution and habitat
The pouched greenhood grows in woodland and forest, usually in moist, sheltered locations between Bindoon and Mount Barker with a disjunct population east of Esperance. It occurs in the Avon Wheatbelt, Esperance Plains, Jarrah Forest, Swan Coastal Plain and Warren biogeographic regions.

Conservation
Pterostylis concava is classified as "not threatened" by the Government of Western Australia Department of Parks and Wildlife.

References

concava
Endemic orchids of Australia
Orchids of Western Australia
Plants described in 1989